The following list shows the recipients for the Country Music Association Award for Vocal Group of the Year.

The award was first presented in 1967 to The Stoneman Family. Dolly Parton was the first female recipient of the award, winning in 1968 for her work with Porter Wagoner. The Judds and the Dixie Chicks are the only all-female groups to win the award, with Parton and June Carter Cash receiving the award as part of a male/female duo and Highway 101, Lady Antebellum and Little Big Town including female members. In 1970, a separate award was established for vocal duo. The Statler Brothers are the group with the most wins in this category, with nine wins.

Recipients

Category facts
Most wins

Most nominations

Won on first nomination

 The Stoneman Family (1967)
 Dolly Parton and Porter Wagoner (1968)
 Highway 101 (1988)
 Kentucky Headhunters (1990)
 The Mavericks (1995)
 (The Chicks) Dixie Chicks (1998)

References

Country Music Association Awards